The 1st Foreign Engineer Regiment is one of two combat engineer regiments of the Foreign Legion in the French Army. The regiment provides the combat engineering component of the 6th Light Armoured Brigade.

It is currently stationed at Quartier General Rollet in Laudun-l'Ardoise, Gard, southern France.

History, creation and different nominations

Heir to the 6th Foreign Infantry Regiment (6e REI)

World War II 

6th Foreign Infantry Regiment (1939 – 1/1/1942), (1949–1955)

" Oriental Mediterranean Regiment " known as Regiment du Levant, the 6th Foreign Infantry Regiment has existed through history on two occasions, in the Levant (Syria and Lebanon) from October 1, 1939 to January 1, 1942 and in Tunisia from April 1, 1949 to June 1955. At creation in 1939, the manpower came from the 1st, 4th, 6th battalions of the 1st Foreign Infantry Regiment, 1er R.E.I (forming the 1st, 2nd, 4th battalions of the 6e R.E.I) and the 2nd battalion of the 2nd Foreign Infantry Regiment (forming the 3rd battalion of the 6e R.E.I) with the Legion Artillery Group of the Levant (French: Groupe d'Artillerie de Légion du Levant, G.A.L.L) compromising 3 artillery batteries. On August 23, 1941; the 6th Foreign Infantry Regiment embarked at Marseilles; reduced from the results of combats to the 1st, 2nd, 3rd battalion and an artillery group, the regiment rallied to the Free French including other French constituents. The regiment was disbanded on January 1, 1942 after the British success in the Syria–Lebanon Campaign and its legionnaires were transferred into the 1st Foreign Regiment and Communal Depot of the Foreign Regiments while 690 of the 6th Foreign Infantry Regiment opted for Charles de Gaulle. The regiment left Lebanon on August 16, 1941 and rejoined the Camp Idron (Pau) on August 25 before rejoining Sidi-bel-Abbès on December 3, 1941. During the regiment's dissolve on December 31, 1941, the legionnaires of the 6th Foreign Infantry Regiment were assigned to the later reconstituted 1st Foreign Marching Infantry Regiment (1er R.E.I.M) and the Marching Regiment of the Foreign Legion (R.M.L.E).

On June 7, 1949, the 3rd battalion of the 6th Foreign Infantry Regiment embarked for Indochina and transformed to the 1st battalion of the 5th Foreign Infantry Regiment on October 31. The 6th Foreign Infantry Regiment participated to the operations of maintaining order. The regiment notably engaged in the battles of djebel Selloum, Kasserine and djebel Gouleb. the 6th Foreign Infantry Regiment was dissolved for the second time on June 30, 1955 when the French Foreign Legion was in phase of reorganization following the return from Indochina.

Creation of the 6th Foreign Engineer Regiment (6e REG) 
6th Foreign Engineer Regiment (1984–1999)

The 1st Foreign Engineer Regiment (1er Régiment Etranger de Génie), 1er REG) was created in 1984 as the 6th Foreign Engineer Regiment. On July 1, 1984, Foreign Legion Groupment, G.L.E Commander, général Jean-Claude Coullon assisted to the patronization ceremony marking the enacting of the 6th Foreign Engineer Regiment, 6e R.E.G. For the first time in Legion history, the colors of a French foreign legion regiment included the inscription "Génie". Accordingly, the 6th Foreign Engineer Regiment ( 6e R.E.G ) received the regimental colors on October 12, 1984. The creation of the 6th Foreign Engineer Regiment ( 6e R.E.G ) was delayed with a doubtful bet. The Legion had a long history of Fortification construction, however, had little experience in combat engineering assault. The whites cadres combat engineer assault specialist of the general regime, a part component of the Military Combat Engineer Assault of the French Army brought forth their precious savoir-faire and formed the legionnaires in the various fields of specialties. Material arrived and the units prowled.

The combat section and companies of the 6e REG deployed in missions of short duration in Mayotte, Guyane, the Central African Republic and very quickly the regiment gained its first combat experience. For the actions of 6th Foreign Engineer Regiment ( 6e R.E.G ) in Tchad at Faya-Largeau in 1987, the 1st combat company was cited at the orders of the armed forces with the Croix de la Valeur militaire. In the same theater of combat engagement, Sergent-Chef Panic was killed by an Anti-tank mine on January 14, 1988 during a mission of opening and clearing the route.

In 1989, a detachment of the 6th Foreign Engineer Regiment trained Pakistanis in demining during Operation Salam in Pakistan. At Laudun, the mood and mode of the regiment was accelerated by the dispatching of combat companies, sections and small separate detachments tasked with punctual missions. In 1990, for the first time, the entire regiment intervened. In Iraq and Kuwait, the 6th Foreign Engineer Regiment participated to the victorious offensive of the Division Daguet part of Opération Daguet and was seen cited at the orders of the armed forces with Croix de guerre des théâtres d'opérations extérieures with a palm. During the Gulf War, D.I.N.O.P.S operated in support of the U.S. Army's 82nd Airborne Division, and provided the EOD services to the division. After the cease fire took hold they conducted a joint mine clearing operation alongside a Royal Australian Navy Clearance Diver Team Unit. Barely in return to Laudun, combat companies were seen redispatched to new theatres of combat operations. The regiment would be found in Cambodia, Bosnia, Somalia, Rwanda, Kosovo and other geographical locations.

Campaigns 
 Engineer Combat Missions

The 6th Foreign Engineer Regiment ( 6e REG ) then 1st Foreign Engineer Regiment (1er REG) engaged in:
 Somalia, (Operation Oryx)
 Cambodia, (United Nations Transitional Authority in Cambodia (Opérations Marquis 1 et 2)
 Ex-Yugoslavia – Sarajevo (UNPROFOR) and NATO
 Rwanda, (Operation Turquoise)
 Kosovo, (Operation Trident)
 Eritrea, United Nations Mission in Ethiopia and Eritrea
 Tchad (Operation Epervier)

 Humanitarian Missions
 Operation Salam in Pakistan, initiating the formation of Afghans on techniques of mine clearing
 Operations in Indonesia, Sumatra during the 2004 Indian Ocean earthquake and tsunami
 Operations in France during intense floods
 Operation Tamour, protective security operations in support of medical treatment for children

1st Foreign Engineer Regiment (1er REG) 
1st Foreign Engineer Regiment (1999–present)

The 1st Foreign Engineer Regiment on was renamed on July 1, 1999 with the creation of the 2nd Foreign Engineer Regiment 2e REG.

Organization 
The regiment is composed of 980 men organized into 8 companies.
 Compagnie de Commandement et de Logistique (CCL) – Command and Logistics Company
 Legion Pionniers Groups
 Compagnie d'Administration et de Soutien (CAS) – Administrative and Services Company
 1er Compagnie de Combat – 1st Combat Company (3 combat sections, a support section and a command section)
 2e Compagnie de Combat – 2nd Combat Company (3 combat sections, a support section and a command section)
 3e Compagnie de Combat – 3rd Combat Company (3 combat sections, a support section and a command section)
 4e Compagnie de Combat – 4th Combat Company ( 3 combat sections, a support section and a command section)
 Compagnie d'Appui (CA) – Support Company
 5e Compagnie – 5th Reserve Company
 PCG Teams (Combat Engineer Divers) former DINOPS Teams of Nautical Subaquatic Intervention Operational Detachment specialized in Parachute, Underwater demolition and Diving.

Traditions

Insignias

Regimental Colors

Regimental Song 
Chant de Marche : Le fanion claque et s'élève featuring:
Le fanion claque et s'élève
Au dessus du pont romain.
Légionnaire marche sans trève
Sur les pas de nos anciens.
Les médailles sonnent sur le tablier,
Sur l'épaule brille la hache du pionnier.
Honneur fidélité.
Premier régiment étranger de génie
Grenades à sept flammes sur ta cuirasse brille.
Honneur fidélité

En sondant, les baïonnettes
Chantent toutes le même refrain,
Il faut faire place nette
Déminer tout le terrain.
Les grappins soulèvent des mines piégées
Il faut avancer au mépris du danger.
Honneur fidélité.
Premier régiment étranger de génie
Grenades à sept flammes sur ta cuirasse brille.
Honneur fidélité.

Une seule devise aux lèvres :
Légio patria nostra.
Le lance flammes ou la portière
Légionnaire tu serviras.
Quand le vert et rouge de ton fanion surgit
C'est la débandade dans les rangs ennemis.
Honneur fidélité.
Premier régiment étranger de génie
Sapeur de combat sans crainte ni répit.
Honneur fidélité

Decorations 
 La Croix de la Valeur militaire, 1st combat company, for engagement in Tchad in 1987.
 La Croix de guerre des théâtres d'opérations extérieures, the 6th Foreign Engineer Regiment 6e REG, for engagement in Kuwait in Opération Daguet, 1990.
 La Croix de la Valeur militaire, with 1 palm, the regiment, as of 2009 for engagement in Afghanistan part of Operation Pamir )

Honors

Battle honours 
 Camerone 1863
 Koweït 1990–1991

Regimental Commanders

See also 
 List of French Foreign Legion units

Notes

References 
 www.legion-etrangere.com

External links 
 Official website – 1er Régiment étranger de génie 
 1er REG's History & images – 1er REG History 

French Army
1st Foreign Engineer Regiment
Military units and formations established in 1949
Military units and formations disestablished in 1955